The 2013 European Mixed Team Badminton Championships were held at the Borisoglebsky Arena in Ramenskoye, Moscow Oblast, Russia, from 12–17 February 2013, and were organised by the Badminton Europe and the National Badminton Federation of Russia.

Medalists

Group stage

Group 1

Group 2

Group 3

Group 4

Group 5

Group 6

Group 7

Group 8

Knockout stage

Quarterfinals

Semifinals

Final

References

External links
tournamensoftware.com

European Mixed Team Badminton Championships
European Mixed Team Badminton Championships
Badminton
Badminton tournaments in Russia
International sports competitions hosted by Russia
February 2013 sports events in Russia